Dominic Joseph Leone (born October 26, 1991), nicknamed Dominator, is an American professional baseball pitcher in the Texas Rangers organization. He played college baseball for the Clemson Tigers. The Seattle Mariners selected Leone in the 16th round of the 2012 Major League Baseball draft. He has played in Major League Baseball (MLB) for the Mariners, Arizona Diamondbacks, Toronto Blue Jays, St. Louis Cardinals, Cleveland Indians, and San Francisco Giants.

High school and college
Leone attended Norwich Free Academy in Norwich, Connecticut, where he played for the school's baseball team. Undrafted out of high school, he enrolled at Clemson University, where he pitched for the Clemson Tigers baseball team.

When he was a true freshman, the Tigers turned to Leone in a game in which they faced postseason elimination; Leone won the game, which sent the team to the 2010 College World Series. A strained shoulder in his sophomore year led him to develop his off-speed pitches. After the 2011 season, he played collegiate summer baseball with the Chatham Anglers of the Cape Cod Baseball League. In his junior year, he had a 7–4 win–loss record and a 5.25 earned run average (ERA). While struggling in his junior year, Leone taught himself to throw a cutter by watching YouTube videos of Mariano Rivera.

Professional career

Seattle Mariners

The Seattle Mariners selected Leone in the 16th round of the 2012 Major League Baseball draft, and he received a $100,000 signing bonus when he signed with the team. The Mariners assigned him to the Short Season-A Everett AquaSox, where he made 19 appearances and posted a 3–0 record, 1.36 ERA, and 39 strikeouts in 33 innings. 

In 2013, Leone began the season with the Class-A Clinton LumberKings. After he pitched  scoreless innings for Clinton, the Mariners promoted Leone to the Advanced-A High Desert Mavericks of the California League, where he served as their closer. In July, Leone was promoted to the Double-A Jackson Generals, where he ended the 2013 season. In 48 combined appearances across three minor league levels, Leone posted a 1–3 record, 2.25 ERA, and 64 strikeouts in 64 innings. In the offseason, he made 11 relief appearances for the Peoria Javelinas of the Arizona Fall League, and recorded a 3.00 ERA and 15 strikeouts.

On April 4, 2014, the Mariners selected Leone's contract from the Triple-A Tacoma Rainiers of the Pacific Coast League, promoting him to the major leagues. He remained with the Mariners for the entire 2014 season, making 57 relief appearances and posting an 8–2 record, 2.17 ERA, and 70 strikeouts in 66 innings.

During spring training in 2015, Leone struggled with his command, and the Mariners assigned him to Triple-A Tacoma. When the Mariners placed Tom Wilhelmsen on the disabled list in early April, they promoted Leone. Leone made 10 appearances with the Mariners in 2015, posting a 6.35 ERA and nine walks in 11 innings. In the minors, he put up a 1–1 record, 7.71 ERA, and eight strikeouts in 9.

Arizona Diamondbacks
On June 3, 2015, Leone, along with Welington Castillo, Gabby Guerrero, and Jack Reinheimer, was traded to the Arizona Diamondbacks for Mark Trumbo and Vidal Nuño. Leone made three appearances for the Diamondbacks in 2015, and went 0–1 with a 14.73 ERA in 3 innings. With the Double-A Mobile BayBears, Leone made 19 appearances and pitched to a 1–2 record, 3.90 ERA, and 28 strikeouts in 27 innings. Leone was ejected by Vic Carapazza in a game against the Miami Marlins for hitting Christian Yelich with a pitch in retaliation to Jose Fernandez hitting David Peralta earlier that game. In 2016, Leone split time between the Diamondbacks and the Triple-A Reno Aces. With Arizona he posted a 0–1 record, 6.33 ERA, and 23 strikeouts in 27 innings. With Reno, Leone went 5–2 in 33 relief appearances, and recorded a 3.34 ERA and 36 strikeouts in 35 innings. In November 2016, Leone was designated for assignment by the Diamondbacks.

Toronto Blue Jays
On November 18, 2016, Leone was claimed off waivers by the Toronto Blue Jays. Though initially sent by the Blue Jays to their minor league camp late in spring training, Leone was recalled on April 2 to start the 2017 season with the major league club, taking the roster spot of the injured closer Roberto Osuna. He was optioned to the Triple-A Buffalo Bisons on May 30 but was recalled again on June 6. Leone was placed on the bereavement list for undisclosed reasons on August 13, and activated on August 16. On September 11, Leone earned his first major league save when he pitched a scoreless 9th inning in a 4–3 victory against the Baltimore Orioles. Leone would finish his first season as a Blue Jay appearing in 65 games, posting a 2.56 ERA, and striking out 81 batters over 70 innings.

Leone qualified for super two status during the 2017-18 offseason, and signed a one-year, $1.085 million contract for the 2018 season on January 12, 2018.

St. Louis Cardinals

On January 19, 2018, the Blue Jays traded Leone and Conner Greene to the St. Louis Cardinals for outfielder Randal Grichuk. On May 9, he was placed on the 10-day disabled list with nerve damage in his right arm, and on May 30, he was transferred to the 60-day disabled list. In 13 innings pitched prior to his injury, he compiled a 4.15 ERA with 15 strikeouts. He was activated from the disabled list on August 26. Leone finished his first season in St. Louis with a 1-2 record and a 4.50 ERA in 29 relief appearances.

Leone began 2019 in St. Louis' bullpen, but was sent down to the Memphis Redbirds in May after pitching to an 8.02 ERA in  innings. He was recalled to St. Louis on June 25, but optioned again on July 21. He was recalled once again on August 22, finishing the season in St. Louis. Over  relief innings pitched during the regular season with the Cardinals, Leone went 1-0 with a 5.53 ERA, striking out 46. Leone was designated for assignment on November 20, 2019. He was released on November 25.

Cleveland Indians
On January 23, 2020, Leone signed a minor league deal with the Cleveland Indians. The Indians selected his contract on July 23. Leone was designated for assignment by the Indians on September 11. He had an 8.38 ERA over 9.2 innings pitched in 12 games for the Indians at the time of his designation. After clearing waivers, Leone was outrighted to the Indians' alternate training site roster on September 13, 2020. He elected free agency on October 14.

San Francisco Giants
On December 8, 2020, Leone signed a minor league contract with the San Francisco Giants organization. On June 1, 2021, he was selected to the active roster. On October 3, 2021, Leone struck out Eric Hosmer of the San Diego Padres to end the last game of the season and clinch the NL West division championship for the Giants. In the 2021 regular season, Leone was 4–5 with 2 saves and a career-best 1.51 ERA. He pitched in 57 games (4 starts), covering 53.2 innings in which he allowed 6.2 hits/9 innings.

In 2022, Leone made 55 appearances for San Francisco, posting a 4-5 record (identical to his 2021 record) and 4.01 ERA with 52 strikeouts and three saves in 49.1 innings pitched. On September 10, 2022, Leone was placed on unconditional release waivers.

Texas Rangers
On February 18, 2023, Leone signed a minor league contract with the Texas Rangers organization.

Personal life
Leone and his wife Lauren were married in December 2016.

References

External links

1991 births
American expatriate baseball players in Canada
Arizona Diamondbacks players
Baseball players from Connecticut
Buffalo Bisons (minor league) players
Chatham Anglers players
Clemson Tigers baseball players
Cleveland Indians players
Clinton LumberKings players
Everett AquaSox players
High Desert Mavericks players
Jackson Generals (Southern League) players
Living people
Major League Baseball pitchers
Sportspeople from Norwich, Connecticut
Peoria Javelinas players
San Francisco Giants players
Seattle Mariners players
St. Louis Cardinals players
Tacoma Rainiers players
Toronto Blue Jays players